Biotechnology and Agricultural Trade Program — The 2002 farm bill (P.L. 107-171 Sec. 3204) authorizes appropriations of up to $6 million annually for technical assistance  and public and private sector project grants to remove or mitigate significant foreign  regulatory nontariff barriers to U.S. exports involving: agricultural commodities produced through biotechnology.  Funds can also be used to address trade-related food safety, disease, and other sanitary and phytosanitary trade concerns.

References 

United States Department of Agriculture programs